Eschscholzia ramosa is a species of poppy known by the common name Channel Islands poppy, or simply island poppy.

The plant is endemic to the Channel Islands of California off the Southern California coast (United States), and to Guadalupe Island off the western coast of Baja California state (Mexico).

It is usually found in chaparral habitats.

Description
Eschscholzia ramosa is an annual wildflower growing from a clump of foliage made up of segmented leaves with divided, rounded leaflets.

The erect stalks grow up to 30 centimeters tall. They bear poppy flowers with yellow petals one half to two centimeters long, often with orange spots near the bases.  The fruit is a capsule 4 to 7 centimeters long containing tiny netted brown seeds.

Many of the collections identified as Eschscholzia elegans are actually Eschscholzia ramosa.

External links
CalFlora Database:  (Channel Island poppy,  island poppy)
Jepson Manual Treatment
Photo gallery

ramosa
Flora of California
Flora of Baja California
Flora of Mexican Pacific Islands
Natural history of the California chaparral and woodlands
Natural history of the Channel Islands of California
Flora without expected TNC conservation status